The 2021 Kyrgyzstan Cup was the 30th season of the Kyrgyzstan Cup, the knockout football tournament in Kyrgyzstan. Neftchi Kochkor-Ata won the title for the second time in their history on 18 September, qualifying for the 2022 AFC Cup as a result.

Last 16

Quarter-finals

Semi–finals

Final

See also
2021 Kyrgyz Premier League

External links
Kyrgyzstan Football Union
RSSSF

References

Kyrgyzstan Cup seasons
Kyrgyzstan
Kyrgyzstan Cup